TDR Capital LLP is a British private equity firm headquartered in London, England.

History
TDR Capital was co-founded in 2002 by Manjit Dale, Stephen Robertson, and Tudor Capital. It is located on Bentinck Street in Marylebone, central London.

In 2006, it was a large shareholder of the Gondola Group, which owned PizzaExpress.

In September 2013, TDR acquired the David Lloyd Leisure fitness chain for £750 million.

In 2014 they acquired 85% of the developers Keepmoat. The remaining 15% was acquired by Sun Capital Partners (UK).

In March 2015, it negotiated to acquire LeasePlan. In October 2015, they acquired a stake in Euro Garages.

As of 2015, it has over £4.8 billion (€6.8 billion) in committed capital.

In 2018 founded ilke homes. Volumetric house builder with a factory in Knaresborough.   

In June 2019, it purchased BCA Marketplace.

In October 2020, it purchased Asda from Walmart for £6.8 billion, as part of a consortium with Zuber and Mohsin Issa, with whom it owns EG Group.

References

External links
 

Financial services companies established in 2002
Financial services companies based in London
Private equity firms of the United Kingdom
Companies based in the City of Westminster
Buildings and structures in Marylebone
British companies established in 2002